The House of Commons Standing Committee on Agriculture and Agri-Food (AGRI) is a standing committee of the House of Commons of Canada.

Mandate
 Focus on bills, review of expenditures, policies, and programs of the Department of Agriculture and Agri-Food and its agencies:
 The Canadian Food Inspection Agency
 The Canadian Grain Commission
 The Farm Products Council of Canada
 The Canadian Dairy Commission
 Farm Credit Canada
 Oversight of the Canadian Wheat Board and the Pest Management Regulatory Agency

Membership

Subcommittees
 Subcommittee on Agenda and Procedure (SAGR)

References
Standing Committee on Agriculture and Agri-Food (AGRI)

Agriculture